Castanopsis indica is a tree in the family Fagaceae.

Description
The leaves are thick and leathery with a serrated edge. They are oblong and elliptical, with an acute tip, are nearly evergreen and have a short petiole. The bark of the tree is rough and grey. The fruit is reddish-brown and round, found in small clusters, and is covered with long, thin spines. The fruit is often fed upon by squirrels.

Distribution and habitat
Castanopsis indica grows naturally in Nepal, Bhutan to Taiwan.

Uses
The nuts of the tree are considered edible. The wood is locally used in construction and the bark can be used in tanning. In Nepal the leaves are used to wrap things.

References

indica
Plants described in 1863
Flora of the Indian subcontinent
Flora of Indo-China
Flora of Taiwan